Idaho gubernatorial elections have been held since statehood in 1890 to directly elect the Governor of Idaho. After the initial election was held in October 1890, each subsequent election was held every two years in November until 1946. Elections after 1946 were held in November every four years.

Results

See also

List of governors of Idaho
List of lieutenant governors of Idaho
Elections in Idaho

Notes

 
 
Quadrennial elections